Thomas Alexander Bowie (21 February 1877 — 23 January 1974) was a Scottish first-class cricketer and brewer.

The son of Thomas Bowie senior, an inspector of the poor, he was born at Alloa in February 1877. A club cricketer for Clackmannan County, Bowie made his debut for Scotland in first-class cricket against the touring West Indians at Edinburgh in 1906. He played first-class cricket for Scotland until 1913, making eight appearances. He scored 252 runs in his eight matches at an average of exactly 18; he made two half centuries, with a highest score of 66 against Nottinghamshire in 1908. With his part-time medium pace bowling, he took 4 wickets with best figures of 3 for 34. Bowie served in the First World War, being commissioned as a lieutenant in the Clackmannanshire Volunteer Regiment in December 1916. Outside of cricket, Bowie was a master brewer. He died at Stirling in January 1974.

References

External links
 

1877 births
1974 deaths
People from Alloa
Scottish brewers
Scottish cricketers
British Army personnel of World War I